Holmquistite is a lithium magnesium aluminium inosilicate mineral with chemical formula . It has a Mohs hardness of 5-6 and a specific gravity of 2.95 to 3.13.

Color could vary from black, dark violet to light sky blue.

It occurs as metasomatic replacements on the margins of lithium rich pegmatites.

It was first described in 1913 from an occurrence in Utö, near Stockholm, Sweden. It was named for the Swedish petrologist Per Johan Holmquist (1866–1946).

References

Inosilicates
Orthorhombic minerals
Minerals in space group 62